2008 elections for the Texas Legislature were held on Tuesday, November 4, 2008, in the U.S. state of Texas. The Texas Legislature election was conducted concurrently with the election for the 2008 United States presidential race, the United States Senate seat of Republican John Cornyn, and the state's 32 congressional representatives.

Successful candidates served in the 81st Texas Legislature, that convened on January 13, 2009, at the Texas State Capitol in Austin through June 1, 2009.

This election marks the last time until 2020 that both parties flipped seats in a regularly-scheduled state house election, as well as the last time the Democrats won more than 45% of the seats in the Texas House of Representatives. Additionally, as of 2020, this is the last time Democrats won a state house race in Angelina, Archer, Bee, Borden, Bowie, Caldwell, Cass, Cherokee, Crosby, Delta, Falls, Fisher, Franklin, Garza, Glasscock, Hale, Hopkins, Houston, Howard, Irion, Jim Wells, Jones, Kent, Lamar, Leon, Lynn, Madison, Marion, McLennan, Morris, Panola, Reagan, Red River, Robertson, Rusk, San Jacinto, Sterling, Stonewall, Terry, Titus, Trinity, Tyler, and Wichita county. This is also the first time Republicans won a state house race in Lee County since 2000, Burleson County since 1998, Fayette County since 1922, Colorado County since 1898, and Bastrop County since 1874.

Texas Senate

Statewide

Close races

Results by district 
Race results:

There were two new members of the Senate.

Notable races
District 10: The Democratic Party ran City Councilwoman Wendy Davis against Republican and Sunset Advisory Commission chairperson Kim Brimer. The district had been Republican-leaning, having been won by George W. Bush in 2004 and by Governor Rick Perry in 2002 and 2006. Davis won that race with 49.91% of the vote. In 2014, she was the Democratic nominee for governor to succeed Perry.

District 11: The Democrats ran former Galveston city council member Joseph Jaworski against Republican candidate Mike Jackson. The district encompasses the southeast Houston suburbs and part of Galveston County that has consistently voted for Republicans including George W. Bush in 2004, Governor Perry in 2002 and 2006, and U.S. Senator John Cornyn in 2002. Mike Jackson won that race with 56.48% of the vote.

District 17: The Incumbent Republican Kyle Janek announced he would be resigning from the State Senate effective June 2, 2008 to spend more time with his family, who had moved to Austin. A special election was called and was held concurrently with the general election. 4 Republicans and 2 Democrats ran for the unexpired term, most notably, the Republican Party's Joan Huffman, and Democratic former U.S. Representative Christopher Bell, the party's 2006 nominee for governor. Huffman and Bell advanced to a runoff, held December 16, 2008. Huffman won that race with 56% of the vote.

District 21: Democratic candidate Judith Zaffirini prevailed in her historically Democratic state Senate seat, which includes Laredo. The seat was held from 1967 to 1973 by her mentor, Wayne Connally, a younger brother of John Connally. Republicans fielded former Webb County administrative judge Louis Henry Bruni (born 1949), who switched parties in December 2007 to run against Zaffirini. The district voted for George W. Bush in 2004 and Kay Bailey Hutchison in 2006 but for Democratic gubernatorial candidate Chris Bell in 2006.

House of Representatives

Statewide

Close races

Notable races

District 85: District 85, located in West Texas near Lubbock, had been held by Democrat Pete Laney for decades, but his retirement in 2006 left the seat highly vulnerable for a Republican pickup as the area had swung rapidly towards the Republicans since the 1990s. In fact, no Democrat had won any of the counties contained within the district in a presidential election since 1996. Despite this swing, Democrat Joe Heflin managed to win the open seat with 49.01% of the vote in 2006. The seat was again vulnerable in 2008, but Heflin managed to win re-election with 53.38%, severely outperforming Democratic presidential candidate Barack Obama, who only won 27.33% of the district's vote in the concurrent presidential election. Heflin performed best in Crosby County, his home county.

District 97: A special election was held on November 6, 2007, to fill the unexpired term of Rep. Anna Mowery. Dan Barret, who had lost the seat to Mowery in 2006, ran against 6 Republicans in the jungle primary, securing a plurality of 31.53% of the vote. A runoff was held on December 18, 2007, between Barret and second-place finisher, Mark M. Shelton in which Barret won an upset victory with 52.19% of the vote. As the legislative session had already ended, Barret did not spend any time legislating during his term. He was later defeated by Shelton in the 2008 general election, only securing 42.75% of the vote.

District 106: Representative Kirk England was re-elected in 2006 as a Republican with 49.16% of the vote. On September 20, 2007, he announced that he would switch parties and seek re-election as a Democrat. He would later go on to win re-election in 2008 with 55.49% of the vote before losing re-election by 204 votes in 2010 to Republican Rodney E. Anderson.

Results by district 
Election results:

House race summary, Districts 1–25

|}

House race summary, Districts 26–50

|}

House race summary, Districts 51–75

House race summary, Districts 76–100

House race summary, Districts 101–125

House race summary, Districts 126–150

External links

Candidate listings
 Texas Republican Party candidates
 Texas Democratic Party candidates
 Texas Libertarian Party candidates

References

legislature
2008
Texas Legislature